The Women's Elliott 6m was a sailing event on the Sailing at the 2012 Summer Olympics program in Weymouth and Portland National Sailing Academy. The competition was Match race format. It consisted of a round-robin a quarter finals, semi-finals, petit-final and final series. The top eight crews from the round-robin were seeded into the quarter final.

Summary
A total of 98 matches were sailed:
 Sixty-seven matches were sailed in the round robin (inclusive the re-sail of the match between FIN and POR. Finland originally won her round robin race against Portugal, but the race was annulled after a protest by Portugal due to Portuguese boat getting stuck at the turning mark. Finland won the rescheduled race as well.)
 The quarter finals (best 3 out of 5) 16 matches were sailed.
 Semi-final, best 2 out of 3 (best 3 out of 5 was planned. Russia appealed the decision to stop the semi-final after 3 matches and the results of 4th match of the petite final to CAS. The appeal to the semi-finals decision was later rejected.) Six matches were sailed.
 Petit-final and final series (best 3 out of 5) 4 matches.
 In the final a total of 5 matches were sailed.

Schedule

Course areas and course configurations  

For the Elliott 6m the majority of racing took place on course area Nothe, however some racing also occurred in the Portland race area. The location (50° 36.18’ N 02° 25.98’ W) points to the center of the Nothe course area. The target time for the course was 18 minutes. All races were conducted on windward/leeward course configurations of 2 laps.

Results

Round Robin

Knock-out and Finals

5th to 8th place 
Sail-offs for places 5–8, scheduled for August 9, were cancelled due to low winds. The Round-robin results were used for final placement.

Final ranking

Further reading

References 

Women's Elliott 6m
Elliott 6m
Women's events at the 2012 Summer Olympics
Olym